Charles P. Weber (October 22, 1868 – June 13, 1914) nicknamed "Count", was a Major League Baseball pitcher.

He was born in Cincinnati, Ohio and died in Beaumont, Texas after being shot to death.

References

External links

https://www.baseball-almanac.com/legendary/suicides_baseball.shtml

1868 births
1914 deaths
Deaths by firearm in Texas
Major League Baseball pitchers
Washington Senators (1891–1899) players
Beaumont Oil Gushers players
Baseball players from Ohio
19th-century baseball players